Clarence Alexander Boucher (November 1, 1897 — March 23, 1970) was a Canadian ice hockey defenceman who played in the National Hockey League for the New York Americans between 1926 and 1928. The rest of his career, which lasted from 1919 to 1929, was spent in various minor leagues.

Career statistics

Regular season and playoffs

External links
 

1897 births
1970 deaths
Canadian ice hockey defencemen
Ice hockey people from Ontario
New Haven Eagles players
New York Americans players
Niagara Falls Cataracts players
Ontario Hockey Association Senior A League (1890–1979) players
Sportspeople from North Bay, Ontario